All Hail is Kïll Cheerleadër's first full-length album, released in 2004, by Spinerazor/Corporate Punishment Records and later reissued in 2006. 6 out of the 12 songs on this album were featured on their previous releases as well.

Track listing 
"Sell Your Soul" (E.Deth, T.War) – 3:11 (Appeared on Gutter Days as "RNR")
"So Young" (E.Deth, T.War, C.MacKinnon) – 3:43 (Appeared on the Go demo as "Go")
"Deathboy" (E.Deth, T.War) – 2:39 
"Lady of the Night" (E.Deth, T.War) – 3:39 (Appeared on Gutter Days as "Straight To Hell")
"No Feelings" (E.Deth, T.War, C.MacKinnon) – 3:30
"Go Away" (E.Deth, T.War) – 3:38
"Find Your Own Way Home" (E.Deth, T.War, C.MacKinnon) – 3:08
"Want Action" (E.Deth, T.War) – 3:14 (Appeared on the Go demo and Gutter Days)
"Don't Call Me Baby, Baby" (E.Deth, T.War, C.MacKinnon) – 3:55 (Appeared on Gutter Days)
"Bad Habit" (E.Deth, T.War) – 3:15 (Appeared on the Go demo)
"No Lullabies" (E.Deth, T.War) – 3:42
"Hurt the People You Love" (E.Deth, T.War) – 0:49

Personnel 
 Ethan Deth - Vocals, Bass
 Anthony Useless (T. War) - Vocals, Guitar
 Chad MacKinnon - Lead Guitar
 Kriss Rites - Drums
 All songs arranged by Kïll Cheerleadër
 Recorded and Produced by Jordon Zadoronsky and Kïll Cheerleadër
 Mixed by Terry Sawchuck, Kïll Cheerleadër, Jordon Zadoronsky (track 11) and No One (track 12)
 Mix Touch-Ups - Ted Onyszczak
 Mastered by Andy Krehm
 Exec. Produced by Spencer Cage
 Drums on track 3 by Jimmy Nova
 Cover Art by Ethan Deth and Penny Parker

Critical reception
Evan Davies of Now gave the album a three out of five rating, calling it "a well-executed and upbeat hard rock album that succeeds at capturing the band’s energy and sweat without compromising quality", and noting similarities to Motörhead and Mötley Crüe.

References 

2006 albums
Kïll Cheerleadër albums